Modern American cheese is a type of processed cheese developed in the 1910s made from cheddar, Colby, or similar cheeses. It is mild with a creamy and salty flavor, has a medium-firm consistency, and has a low melting point. It is typically yellow or white in color; yellow American cheese is seasoned and colored with annatto.

History  
British colonists made cheddar cheese soon after their arrival in North America. By 1790, American-made cheddars were being exported back to England. According to Robert Carlton Brown, author of The Complete Book of Cheese, what was known in America as yellow cheese or store cheese was known as American cheddar or Yankee cheddar back in England. The Oxford English Dictionary lists the first known usage of "American cheese" as occurring in the Frankfort, Kentucky, newspaper The Guardian of Freedom in 1804.

After patenting a new method for manufacturing processed cheese in 1916, James L. Kraft began marketing it in the late 1910s, and the term "American cheese" rapidly began to refer to the processed variety instead of the traditional but more expensive cheddars also made and sold in the U.S.

Legal definitions
According to the Standards of Identity for Dairy Products, part of the U.S. Code of Federal Regulations (CFR), to be labeled "American cheese" a processed cheese is required to be manufactured from cheddar cheese, colby cheese, washed curd cheese, or granular cheese, or any mixture of two or more of these. The CFR also includes regulations for the manufacturing of processed American cheese.

Because its manufacturing process differs from traditional cheeses, federal laws mandate that it be labeled as "pasteurized process American cheese" if made from combining more than one cheese or "pasteurized process American cheese food" if it contains at least 51% cheese but other specific dairy ingredients such as cream, milk, skim milk, buttermilk, cheese whey, or albumin from cheese whey are added. Products that have other added ingredients, such as Kraft Singles that contain milk protein concentrate, use legally unregulated terms such as "pasteurized prepared cheese product".

Manufacturing process
Traditional cheese is ground, combined with emulsifying agents and other ingredients, mixed and heated until it forms a "melted homogeneous" mixture. To pasteurize it, the cheese mixture must be heated to a temperature of at least  for a minimum of 30 seconds. Composition requirements of processed American cheese control the percentage of milkfat, moisture, salt and pH value in the final product, along with specifications for flavor, body and texture, color, and meltability.

Processed American cheese is packaged in individually wrapped slices, as unwrapped slices sold in stacks, or in unsliced blocks. Individually wrapped slices are formed from processed cheese which solidifies only between the wrapping medium; these slices, sold as 'singles', are typically the least like traditional cheese. Blocks of American cheese are more similar to traditional cheese, and are sliced to order at deli counters.

Market size
Americans purchased about $2.77 billion worth of American cheese in 2018, but the popularity was falling, and, according to Bloomberg News, sales were projected to drop 1.6% in 2018. The average price for a pound of American cheese was below $4 for the first time since 2011.

See also 

 Government cheese
 List of cheeses
 List of dairy products

Notes

Further reading 

 Making American cheese on the farm for home consumption, Farmers' Bulletin No. 1734, U.S. Department of Agriculture, October 1934. Hosted at University of North Texas Government Documents Department.
 An American-type cheese: how to make it for home use, Farmers' Bulletin No. 2075, U.S. Department of Agriculture, October 1954.

American cheeses
Processed cheese